Beyond Geek is an American documentary television series that airs on PBS and public television stations across America.
Beyond Geek Season 1 featured the 24 Hours of LeMons, Dagorhir, Belegarth, Amtgard, 8 Bit Weapon, NES Homebrew, JP Aerospace, WW2 Re-enactors, and Real-life Superheroes. Season 2 features Kinetic Sculpture Racing, Lightsaber Combat, Hackathon, Pirate Re-enactors, Professional Wrestling, Telerobotics, and Star Trek Fan Films.

History 
Joe Gillis came up with the idea for Beyond Geek about 2008. He wanted to make a show about things that interested him, and he felt there was a void that needed to be filled when it came to shows about geeky things. It started as a project he was going to do while he was on hiatus in-between seasons on the TV shows he was working on. The problem was the hiatus never happened, so it became a project he worked on during any extra time he had – which wasn't a lot. Eventually, he decided it was time to bite the bullet, and he went all in with a Field of Dreams approach to television – if you make it, they will come. So he called in all his favors, talked his wife into using all their savings, and they set out to make the first season.

Episodes 
Season 1 ran from October 1, 2014 – November 5, 2014 with six episodes hosted by Nate Lake, Sage Michael, and Dan Reynoso. Season 2 will run May 1, 2017 – June 19, 2017 with eight episodes hosted by Brittni Barger, Nate Lake, and Dan Reynoso.

Season 1

Season 2

External links 
 Official website

References 

2014 American television series debuts
2010s American documentary television series
PBS original programming
English-language television shows